Murgo is a small hilly village which lies on the border of Leh district in the union territory of Ladakh in India, close to Chinese-controlled Aksai Chin. It is one of the northernmost villages of India.

Name 
The name "Murgo" means "gateway of hell" in Tibetic languages. Record from the 1840s indicates the Turkic name was Murgai and Tibetan name was Murgo-Chumik. (Chumik means spring.)

History 
Murgo was a campsite on the difficult caravan route through Karakoram Pass, the last place with sufficient vegetation for fuel and grass. Czech paleontologist and biologist Ferdinand Stoliczka died here in 1874 during an expedition. A memorial was erected for him in the Moravian cemetery at Leh.

There is a large Buddhist monastery at Murgo.

Current status 
The village is now inhabited by a small civilian population of Baltis. However, the Indian Armed Forces have significant presence in the area. The Darbuk–Shyok–DBO Road running between Leh and Daulat Beg Oldi passes through Murgo.

The temperature plummets as low as -50 C in the winters. The weather deteriorates frequently with strong icy winds lashing much of Murgo. Murgo has very little if any vegetation or wildlife. Telecommunication is only available through INMARSAT satellite phones.

References

Villages in Nubra tehsil